The Lodging House for Gentleman is a 1922 German silent film directed by Louis Ralph and starring Ralph, Karl Etlinger and Friedrich Kühne.

Cast
 Louis Ralph
 Karl Etlinger
 Friedrich Kühne
 Ludwig Trautmann
 Dina Harbitschenko
 Daisy Torrens
 Emil Wittig
 Maria Voigtsberger
 Dagmar Muthardt
 Inge Helgard

References

Bibliography
 Helga Belach & Wolfgang Jacobsen. Richard Oswald: Regisseur und Produzent. Text + Kritik, 1990.

External links

1922 films
Films of the Weimar Republic
German silent feature films
Films directed by Louis Ralph
German black-and-white films
National Film films
1920s German films